Adolfo Lugo Verduzco (24 March 1933 – 21 January 2022) was a Mexican politician and speaker, affiliated with the Institutional Revolutionary Party (PRI). He was a senator, chairman of the PRI and governor of Hidalgo.

Biography
Lugo Verduzco was the son of Adolfo Lugo Guerrero and wife Magdalena Verduzco Andrade. He received a bachelor's degree in law from the National Autonomous University of Mexico, a master's degree in public administration from the Institute of Social Studies at The Hague (Netherlands) and took a specialization in public administration at the École nationale d'administration, (France).

He joined the Institutional Revolutionary Party (PRI) in 1952 and chaired it from 1982 until 1986. He also served in the Mexican Senate from 1982 until 1988 and governor of Hidalgo from 1987 to 1993. Lugo Verduzco died on 21 January 2022, at the age of 88.

References

Sources
 Diccionario biográfico del gobierno mexicano, Ed. Fondo de Cultura Económica, Mexico, 1992.

1933 births
2022 deaths
20th-century Mexican politicians
Governors of Hidalgo (state)
Members of the Senate of the Republic (Mexico)
Presidents of the Institutional Revolutionary Party
National Autonomous University of Mexico alumni
Politicians from Hidalgo (state)
People from Huichapan